"Promise" is a song by R&B group Jagged Edge. The song spent two weeks at number one on the U.S. R&B chart and peaked at number 9 on the U.S. Pop chart. It was number 7 on the Rhythmic Top 40. It was ranked number 48 on the 2001 Billboard Hot 100 Year End.

Charts

End of year charts

References

Jagged Edge (American group) songs
Song recordings produced by Jermaine Dupri
Songs written by Jermaine Dupri
Music videos directed by Bryan Barber
So So Def Recordings singles
1999 songs
Songs written by Bryan-Michael Cox
Contemporary R&B ballads
2000s ballads

2000 singles